John Seasman (born 21 February 1955) is an English former professional footballer who played in the Football League as a midfielder.

References

Sources
 

1955 births
Living people
Footballers from Liverpool
English footballers
Association football midfielders
Tranmere Rovers F.C. players
Luton Town F.C. players
Millwall F.C. players
Rotherham United F.C. players
Cardiff City F.C. players
Rochdale A.F.C. players
Chesterfield F.C. players
Northwich Victoria F.C. players
Aylesbury United F.C. players
Runcorn F.C. Halton players
Accrington Stanley F.C. players
Hyde United F.C. players
English Football League players